The 2006 1000 km of Donington was the fourth race of the 2006 Le Mans Series season run by the ACO.  It was run on 27 August 2006

Official results
Class winners in bold.  Cars failing to complete 70% of winner's distance marked as Not Classified (NC).

Statistics
 Pole Position – #12 Courage Compétition – 1:20.756
 Fastest Lap – #9 Creation Autosportif – 1:21.527
 Average Speed – 167.211 km/h

External links

D
1000km of Donington
6 Hours of Donington